Willoughby Ions (1881–1977) was an American composer, artist, poet and dramatist. She was also an art administrator for the Federal Art Project.

Born Estelle de Willoughby Ions in New Orleans, she was married twice.
She wrote the play The Age of Innocents and the opera All in a Golden Springtime.
She was a member of the Equal Suffrage League of Virginia.
She was a partner of Adèle Clark, who was her first cousin.

Some of her artworks are held at the National Gallery of Art. Her papers are held at the Virginia Historical Society. In 1964 she was interviewed as part of an oral history project by the Archives of American Art.

References

External links

Waste Not, Want Not

1881 births
1977 deaths
American arts administrators
Women arts administrators
American women composers
American women dramatists and playwrights
20th-century American dramatists and playwrights
20th-century American women writers
Federal Art Project artists
20th-century American composers
Writers from New Orleans
Musicians from New Orleans
American lesbian musicians
American lesbian writers
20th-century American women musicians
20th-century women composers
19th-century American LGBT people
20th-century American LGBT people